Long Rock is a large rock extending  in east–west direction,  wide and rising to  in the northeast of Morton Strait in the South Shetland Islands, Antarctica.  The area was visited by early 19th century sealers operating on Byers Peninsula.

The feature was named by Discovery Investigations personnel that charted Morton Strait in 1930–31.

Location

See also 
 Composite Antarctic Gazetteer
 List of Antarctic islands south of 60° S
 SCAR
 Territorial claims in Antarctica

Maps
 Península Byers, Isla Livingston. Mapa topográfico a escala 1:25000. Madrid: Servicio Geográfico del Ejército, 1992.
 L.L. Ivanov et al. Antarctica: Livingston Island and Greenwich Island, South Shetland Islands. Scale 1:100000 topographic map. Sofia: Antarctic Place-names Commission of Bulgaria, 2005.
 L.L. Ivanov. Antarctica: Livingston Island and Greenwich, Robert, Snow and Smith Islands. Scale 1:120000 topographic map.  Troyan: Manfred Wörner Foundation, 2009.

References

External links
Composite Antarctic Gazetteer

Rock formations of the South Shetland Islands